The Trumpchi GS7, later the Trumpchi GS8S, is a mid-size crossover SUV produced by GAC Group under the Trumpchi brand in China and the GAC Motor brand globally.

Overview

Being essentially the smaller five-seater version of the larger seven-seater Trumpchi GS8, the GS7 has been redesigned from the C-pillar onward to the rear to differentiate from the larger GS8. The GS7 had a worldwide debut during the Detroit Auto Show, and was launched in China in June 2017 with pricing starting from 155,800 yuan to 230,000 yuan. 

As of 2018, the GS7 is powered by the 2.0-liter four-cylinder turbo engine and six-speed automatic transmission developed in-house by GAC. The 2.0-liter multi-port injected inline-4 engine includes auto start/stop and delivers 198 hp and 236 lb-ft of torque. The AWD system is also offered which includes a requisite terrain response knob, featuring sand, trail, snow, and normal scenario settings.

Trumpchi GS8S
The Trumpchi GS8S was launched in April 2020. Essentially a facelifted GS7, the GS8S sits slightly below the regular GS8 as a 5-Seater Trumpchi GS8, the exterior difference being the front and rear parts with the later model having a redesigned and more aggressive front grille. It is powered by a redesigned 2.0 liter direct-injection turbocharged engine. The engine produces a maximum power of 252 ps and peak torque of 390 Nm and meets the China-6 emission standards. Transmission is a 6-speed automatic gearbox.

See also
 List of GAC vehicles

References

External links

 
 (Global)

Mid-size sport utility vehicles
Front-wheel-drive vehicles
All-wheel-drive vehicles
Cars introduced in 2017
Cars of China
GS7
Crossover sport utility vehicles